Bani Walid or Ben Walid, prior to 2007, was one of the districts of Libya, administrative town Bani Walid. In the 2007 administrative reorganization the territory formerly in Bani Walid District was transferred to Misrata District.

Bani Walid bordered the following districts:
Tarhuna wa Msalata - north
Misrata - northeast
Sirte - east
Mizda - west
Gharyan - northwest, at a quadripoint

Notes

See also
 Bani Walid

External links
 Bani Walid museum

Former districts of Libya